Dexopollenia fangensis is a species of cluster fly in the family Polleniidae.

Distribution
Vietnam, Thailand.

References

Polleniidae
Insects described in 1995
Diptera of Asia